Flavien Dassonville (born 16 February 1991 in Montdidier, Somme) is a French former professional cyclist.

Major results

2013
 1st  Road race, National Under-23 Road Championships
 1st Paris–Tours Espoirs
2014
 2nd Tro-Bro Léon
 3rd Paris-Troyes
 8th Overall Boucles de la Mayenne
 8th Classic Loire Atlantique
2016
 1st  Mountains classification Tour du Limousin
 4th Overall Circuit des Ardennes
1st  Mountains classification
2017
 1st  Overall Tour de Bretagne
1st Stage 2
 1st  Overall Ronde de l'Oise
1st Stage 1
 1st La Roue Tourangelle
 6th Overall Boucles de la Mayenne
 9th Classic Loire Atlantique
2018
 7th Grand Prix des Marbriers

References

External links

1991 births
Living people
French male cyclists